The Easter Monday match is held annually on the Easter Monday holiday in Australia between the Parramatta Eels and Wests Tigers. It is generally played at Stadium Australia, however Parramatta home matches were held at Western Sydney Stadium from 2019.

Background
The match has traditionally drawn large crowds, including selling out the opening of the new Western Sydney Stadium, where the Parramatta club defeated the Wests Tigers by a record-breaking 51–6.

No event was held in 2020 due to the season being suspended due to the COVID-19 pandemic.

Head to head

Results

References

Parramatta Eels
Wests Tigers
Rugby league rivalries
Recurring sporting events established in 2015
2015 establishments in Australia
Sports rivalries in Australia
National Rugby League
Rugby league competitions in Australia
Rugby league in Sydney
Easter traditions
Holy Week